Sarah Bedell Smith (born May 27, 1948) is an American journalist and biographer. She has been a contributing editor for Vanity Fair since 1996. Previously, she was a cultural news reporter for  New York Times and Time. She has written biographies of political, cultural, and business figures in the United States and members of the British royal family.

Early life and education 
Sarah Rowbotham was born in Bryn Mawr, Pennsylvania. She is the daughter of Ruth (Kirk) and James Howard Rowbotham, a brigadier general and businessman. She grew up in the nearby town of St. Davids. She graduated from Radnor High School in 1966 and was inducted into the school's Hall of Fame in November 2008. She earned her Bachelor of Arts from Wheaton College and Master of Science from Columbia University Graduate School of Journalism, where she won the Robert Sherwood Memorial Travel-Study Scholarship and the Women's Press Club of New York Award.

Career
Smith spent her early career  as a cultural news reporter for Time, TV Guide, and The New York Times. In 1996, she joined Vanity Fair as contributing editor. 

Smith has written biographies of several notable persons, including television executives, socialites, politicians, and the British royal family.   

As a result of her 2012 biography of Queen Elizabeth II, Elizabeth the Queen: The Life of a Modern Monarch, Smith served as playwright Peter Morgan's consultant on the London and New York productions of The Audience, his award-winning drama about Queen Elizabeth II and her prime ministers, starring Helen Mirren. The book won the Washington Irving Medal for Literary Excellence, and the 2012 Goodreads Choice Award for best book in history and biography.

She was awarded the Sigma Delta Chi Distinguished Service Award in 1982.

Bibliography

References

External links

1948 births
Living people
American biographers
American newspaper editors
American television critics
American women journalists
Columbia University Graduate School of Journalism alumni
The New York Times people
Time (magazine) people
Vanity Fair (magazine) people
Wheaton College (Massachusetts) alumni
Women newspaper editors
American women biographers
21st-century American women